Pondexter is the surname of several notable people:
Cappie Pondexter (born 1983), American basketball player
Cliff Pondexter (born 1954), American basketball player
Quincy Pondexter (born 1988), American basketball player
Roscoe Pondexter (born 1952), American basketball player

See also
Poindexter (disambiguation)